SMILF is an American sitcom starring, created, written, and directed by Frankie Shaw. It was based on her short film of the same title. The series premiered on Showtime on November 5, 2017. The series' name, SMILF, is a play on the term "MILF", with the "S" standing for "single", or "Southie" (a nickname for South Boston), or both. On November 29, 2017, Showtime renewed the series for a second season.

Rosie O'Donnell co-stars as Tutu, the mother of Shaw's character Bridgette. Roseanne Barr was supposed to take on the role of Tutu, but due to a knee injury and subsequent surgery, she could not do so. Connie Britton has a recurring role as Ally, Bridgette's boss. Miguel Gomez and Samara Weaving are also in the cast, as well as Raven Goodwin, who first appeared in a recurring role but was promoted to a starring role in the second season.

On December 17, 2018, The Hollywood Reporter published an exclusive report that cast and crew members were alleging misconduct on the set, including “inappropriately handled sex scenes“, and that co-star Weaving had left the production over breach of contract in the filming of a sex scene. On March 8, 2019, a few days after the fourth episode of season two was broadcast, the series was canceled by ABC Signature, who also suspended a future production deal with Shaw. Showtime played out the full run of season two, with the final episode airing on March 31, 2019.

Cast

Main
Frankie Shaw as Bridgette
Miguel Gomez as Rafi
Samara Weaving as Nelson Rose
Rosie O’Donnell as Tutu
Raven Goodwin as Eliza
Anna and Alexandra Reimer as Larry

Recurring
 Connie Britton as Ally
 Blake Clark as Joe
 Mark Webber as Father Eddie
 Bodega Bamz as Carlos

Episodes

Season 1 (2017)

Season 2 (2019)

Reception

Critical response
On the review aggregation website Rotten Tomatoes, the first season has an approval rating of 82% based on 38 reviews, with an average rating of 6.42/10. The website's critical consensus reads, "A questionable name and superficially familiar tropes mask SMILFs raw, tender core and surprisingly fresh perspective." Metacritic, assigned a weighted average score of 64 out of 100 based on 20 critics, indicating "generally favorable reviews". The show was included in a list on Refinery 29 of 'The 17 Best TV Shows For Women Of 2017', which said, "If there’s one new fall 2017 show you’re going to watch, let it be Showtime’s SMILF [...] Sadly, television rarely allows women to be so layered."

The second season has a 100% approval rating on Rotten Tomatoes, based on 7 reviews, with an average rating of 7.33/10. On Metacritic, it has a score of 73 out of 100, based on 5 critics.

Awards and nominations

References

External links

2010s American single-camera sitcoms
2017 American television series debuts
2019 American television series endings
English-language television shows
Showtime (TV network) original programming
Television series about dysfunctional families
Television series about single parent families
Television series by ABC Signature Studios
Television shows set in Boston